Włodzimierz Skoczylas (7 May 1923 – 29 September 1993) was a Polish actor. He appeared in more than 40 films between 1952 and 1990.

Selected filmography
 Five Boys from Barska Street (1954)
 Irena do domu! (1955)
 Milczące ślady (1961)
 The Two Who Stole the Moon (1962)
 Stawka większa niż życie (1967)

References

External links

1923 births
1993 deaths
Polish male film actors
People from Brodnica County